Bloomfield Township is one of eleven townships in LaGrange County, Indiana. As of the 2010 census, its population was 5,412 and it contained 2,231 housing units.

Bloomfield Township was founded in 1835.

Geography

References

External links
 Indiana Township Association
 United Township Association of Indiana

Townships in LaGrange County, Indiana
Townships in Indiana